Hoadly is a surname, derived from the village of West Hoathly in Sussex. Notable people with the surname include:

Benjamin Hoadly (1676–1761), English clergyman
Charles J. Hoadly (1828–1900), American librarian and historian
George Hoadly, Governor of Ohio
John Hoadly, Archbishop
Samuel Hoadly, Educator, father of Benjamin and John

See also
Hoadly, Virginia, unincorporated community

English toponymic surnames